The 1996 Maryland Terrapins football team represented the University of Maryland in the 1996 NCAA Division I-A football season. In their fifth season under head coach Mark Duffner, the Terrapins compiled a 5–6 record, finished in sixth place in the Atlantic Coast Conference, and were outscored by their opponents 239 to 187. The team's statistical leaders included Brian Cummings with 1,127 passing yards, Brian Underwood with 449 rushing yards, and Geroy Simon with 534 receiving yards.

Schedule

Roster

References

Maryland
Maryland Terrapins football seasons
Maryland Terrapins football